Avi Kwa Ame National Monument is a proposed national monument expected to protect approximately  of the Mojave Desert in southern Nevada. President Joe Biden was reported to be planning to establish it with the authority in the Antiquities Act in March 2023. The monument will be managed by the Bureau of Land Management as part of the National Conservation Lands. It is named for Spirit Mountain, known as Avi Kwa' Ame in Mojave, which is located in the adjacent Lake Mead National Recreation Area and is visible from most of the monument. Spirit Mountain is considered sacred as the site of creation by the Yuman tribes.

Geography 
The area protected will include portions of the Newberry Mountains, Eldorado Mountains, New York Mountains, McCullough Range, and Dead Mountains, as well as most of the Piute Valley and Eldorado Valley which separate them. The monument surrounds excluded areas around the towns of Searchlight and Cal-Nev-Ari, Nevada.

It borders Lake Mead National Recreation Area, Mojave Trails National Monument, Mojave National Preserve, and Castle Mountains National Monument.

The Hiko Springs area has Native American petroglyphs.

Flora and fauna 
Significant species that live in the desert include desert bighorn sheep, desert tortoise, and golden eagles. The Mojave Desert has more than 200 endemic plants. A significant habitat of the Joshua Tree is in the western portion of the monument. The majority of the area (330,000 acres) was designated as the Piute/Eldorado Area of Critical Environmental Concern in 1996 to conserve critical habitat for the desert tortoise.

National monument designation 
The Fort Mojave Indian Tribe has long advocated for the protection of the region's natural and cultural resources. Spirit Mountain was listed on the National Register of Historic Places in 1999. After a proposed large-scale wind farm faced opposition from local Searchlight residents, residents and tribal groups began a push for national monument designation in 2020. The Clark County Commission voted unanimously to support the monument. In February 2022 Congresswoman Dina Titus introduced a bill that would have designated Avi Kwa Ame as a national monument. Interior Secretary Deb Haaland visited the area to discuss the region's significance in September. On November 30, 2022, President Biden announced to attendees of the White House Tribal Nations Summit that he was committed to protecting the area around Spirit Mountain.

Though most of the proposed boundaries already excludes wind energy, the monument designation will prevent the development of new wind and solar power, putting land conservation in contention with reducing emissions. Previous proposals for a wind farm had been blocked by the Bureau of Land Management, and the monument would kill the revised 308 MW Kulning Wind Energy Project. Solar power developers requested that an area near Laughlin, Nevada, be excluded so transmission lines from the proposed 2,500 acre, 400 MW Angora Solar Project can reach facilities at the former Mohave Power Station.

The monument proclamation and management may follow Bears Ears National Monument in recognition of Indiginous influence on the area.

President Biden is expected to announce the creation of the monument at a conservation summit with tribal leaders on March 21, 2023. There was a delay of more than three months in designating the monument after President Biden said he would do so, in part due to in difficulties in schedulding an event in Nevada to make the proclamation. Local reporters expected Biden to make the designation on a trip to Las Vegas on March 14, but plans changed when members of Congress were unable to attend. Part of President Biden's 30 by 30 conservation goals, Avi Kwa Ame will be his largest act of land protection, surpassing Camp Hale—Continental Divide National Monument.

See also 
 List of national monuments of the United States

References

External links
Honor Avi Kwa Ame

Bureau of Land Management National Monuments
Bureau of Land Management National Monuments in Nevada
Protected areas of Clark County, Nevada
Protected areas of the Mojave Desert
Protected areas established in 2023
2023 establishments in Nevada